Kosmos 97 ( meaning Cosmos 97), also known as DS-U2-M No.1, was a Soviet satellite which was launched in 1965 as part of the Dnepropetrovsk Sputnik programme. It was a  spacecraft, which was built by the Yuzhnoye Design Bureau, and used to conduct tests involving atomic clocks.

A Kosmos-2M 63S1M carrier rocket was used to launch Kosmos 97 into low Earth orbit. The launch took place from Site 86/1 at Kapustin Yar. The launch occurred at 12:14 GMT on 26 November 1965, and resulted in the successful insertion of the satellite into orbit. Upon reaching orbit, the satellite was assigned its Kosmos designation, and received the International Designator 1965-095A. The North American Aerospace Defense Command assigned it the catalogue number 01777.
 
Kosmos 97 contained the first experiments with measuring masers. A molecular quantum generator was tested, which makes it possible to communicate with and control other spacecraft, and to send information great distances. Aspects of the Theory of Relativity were also tested.

Kosmos 97 was the first of two DS-U2-M satellites to be launched, the other being Kosmos 145. On 2 April 1967, it decayed from orbit and reentered the atmosphere.

See also

 1965 in spaceflight

References

Spacecraft launched in 1965
Kosmos satellites
Dnepropetrovsk Sputnik program